Yun Chi-Young (Korea:윤치영, hanja:尹致暎, February 10, 1898 – February 10, 1996) was an independence activist, journalist, and politician, diplomat of South Korea. He was the first Interior Minister (1948), 2nd Republic of Korea Ambassador to France from 1950 to 1951, 1st, 2nd and 3rd National Assembly of South Korea and 13th Mayor of Seoul from 1963 to 1966. He studied in the United States and was an entourage to Syngman Rhee.  During the Japanese  occupation, he was a Chief Secretary of Rhee.  After that, he actively participated in independence activities like actively participating in the Korea Commission to American and Europe in the Provisional Government of the Republic of Korea, producing the newspaper Samilshinbo, and assisting Syngman Rhee.  Due to these independence activities, he was arrested in during the Heungeupkurakpu incident and served 9 months in prison.

After the liberation in 1945, he was Syngman Rhee’s secretary, and he also was secretary general of Minjoowiwon.  After the formation of the government in 1948, he served as Minister of the Interior and Deputy Speaker of the National Assembly). 

In the early days of the Syngman Rhee administration, he was known as the influential power of the ruling party. Afterwards, he worked as a diplomatic special envoy for Syngman Rhee, and in 1948, he founded the Korea Nationalist Party, which was pro-Rhee, and served as a member of the supreme council. He ran for vice president in 1956 and 1960, but was defeated. During the Second Republic, he acted as an opposition politician, participated in the military government after the May 16th military coup, and in 1963 nominated President Park Chung-hee of the Supreme Council as the Republican presidential candidate and participated in civil administration. He served as mayor and chairman of the Democratic Republican Party. After 1968, he emphasized the need for a strong leader for economic development and actively supported Park Chung-hee's constitutional amendment for a third term. He was a Protestant, and he served as an elder of the church. He retired from politics in 1980 and worked as a social elder.

Throughout the Rhee and Park regimes, he took a different political course from Yun Posun. He entered politics as a member of the Korea Democratic Party, but after joining the party, he left the party and organized a pro-Rhee Korea Nationalist Party to keep the two opposition parties (the Democratic Nationalists Party and the Korea Democratic Party in check

He was Yun Bo-seon's younger half-uncle, and politician and independence activist Yun Chi-ho's younger cousin. Yun Bo-seon is his second brother, and he is Yun Chi-So's son. His pen name is Dongsan (동산).

Life 

He was the half-uncle of Yun Bo-seon, second President of South Korea. Yun had long time to Entourage and secretary of Syngman Rhee, first president of South Korea. His goal was to help collect Syngman Rhee's independent Activities. He was an extreme anti-Japanese activist and a political messiah worship.

After resigning, he was secretary of Syngman Rhee. From August 1948 to December 1948, he was Interior Minister of South Korea and Ambassador to UN Dispatch. From 1951, he was the 2nd Ambassador of the Republic of Korea in France (주프랑스 한국 공사) to 1952.

From 1948 to 1956, he lost to Lee Ki-poong and the fight, following. At May 16, 1961, the May 16 coup started. He was after approved by Park Chung-Hee.

From December 17, 1963, to March 30, 1966, he was Mayor of Seoul. In 1968, he advised Park Chung-Hee, social security authorities for a long time. He fought his nephew Yun Bo-seon, and he was followed by Park Chung-Hee.

See also 
 American University
 Syngman Rhee
 Park Chung-hee
 Yun Bo-seon
 Seo Jae-pil
 Yun Chi-ho
 Chinilpa
 Yun Chi-Oh
 Heo Jeong
 Chang Myon
 Kim Seong Su

References

External links

 Yun Chi-Young Republic of Korea National Assembly - Profile
 윤치영 (Korea)
 Hepyung Yun's Family Site

1898 births
1996 deaths
People from Seoul
People from South Chungcheong Province
Mayors of Seoul
Government ministers of South Korea
Waseda University alumni
American University alumni
South Korean anti-communists
Korean educators
Yun Chi-ho
Kim Kyu-sik
Park Chung-hee
Korean religious leaders
South Korean Methodists
Democratic Party (South Korea, 1955) politicians
Liberal Party (South Korea) politicians
Democratic Justice Party politicians
South Korean Presbyterians
Members of the National Assembly (South Korea)